is a professional Japanese baseball player. He is a pitcher for the Hokkaido Nippon-Ham Fighters of Nippon Professional Baseball (NPB).

References 

2003 births
Living people
Nippon Professional Baseball pitchers
Hokkaido Nippon-Ham Fighters players
Baseball people from Hokkaido